Shire Hall is a former municipal building in Castle Hill in Cambridge, Cambridgeshire, England. It was the headquarters of Cambridgeshire County Council from 1932 until 2021, when the council moved to New Shire Hall at Alconbury Weald, some 23 miles from Cambridge.

History

In the early 20th century, County Hall in Hobson Street served as the local facility for dispensing justice and as the meeting place of Cambridgeshire County Council. After deciding that the Hobson Street building was too small, county leaders chose to procure a new building; the site they selected had previously been occupied by an early 19th-century prison on the site of Cambridge Castle and was adjacent to an old police station at Castle Hill. The bricks from the old prison were recycled for construction of the new shire hall but the police station was retained and converted for additional office use.

The new building, which was designed by Herbert Henry Dunn in the Neo-Georgian style, was completed in 1932, with the council's first meeting in the building being held on 23 July 1932. The design involved a symmetrical main frontage with fifteen bays facing Castle Hill; the central bay featured a doorway flanked with pilasters on the ground floor; there was a stone balcony and a window with a fanlight on the first floor. Internally, the principal room was the council chamber in the centre of the building on the first floor. An office building known as "The Octagon", because of its shape, was added to the north of the main building in the 1960s and a bunker for use as an emergency planning centre in the event of a nuclear attack was completed in 1989.

In December 2017, as part of a cost-saving scheme, the county council announced plans to move to a smaller purpose-built facility at Alconbury Weald; the proposal was approved by the full county council in May 2018. In May 2019 the county council announced that it would give the developer, Brookgate, a lease of up to 40 years to develop the site for hotel and office accommodation: the terms of the lease would require the developer to provide continued public access to the Castle Mound. The costs of moving the data centre were subsequently estimated at nearly £7 million.

Construction work on the New Shire Hall at Alconbury Weald started in December 2019. The final committee meeting to be held at Shire Hall was on 12 March 2020. Meetings were then held online due to the COVID-19 pandemic for the rest of 2020 and first part of 2021, during which time the council vacated Shire Hall and moved to New Shire Hall, with the first committee meeting at New Shire Hall being held in September 2021.

References

Buildings and structures in Cambridge
C
Government buildings completed in 1932